Đinh Liễn (丁璉, 940 – October 979) or Đinh Khuông Liễn (丁匡璉), was the eldest son of emperor Đinh Bộ Lĩnh, the founding emperor of Đinh dynasty.

Liễn was granted the title Nam Việt vương (南越王, "king of Nam Việt") after his father ascended the throne. Liễn was sent to Song China to pay tribute in 973, and was granted the title Grand Preceptor of Inspection (檢校太師 Kiểm hiệu thái sư), Jiedushi of Tĩnh Hải quân (靜海軍節度使 Tĩnh Hải quân tiết độ sứ) and Governor of the Protectorate General to Pacify the South (安南都護 An Nam đô hộ) by Song Taizu. In 975, his title was promoted to "Prince of Giao Chỉ" (交趾郡王, Giao Chỉ quận vương) by Song court. Liễn was regarded as the ruler of Vietnam by Song China, though his father was the de facto ruler.

In 978, Đinh Hạng Lang was consecrated as the crown prince, which made Liễn dissatisfied. Liễn assassinated Hạng Lang in spring 979. In October, Liễn and his father were killed by a eunuch named  while they were sleeping in the palace courtyard.

References

940 births
979 deaths
Year of birth unknown
Vietnamese princes
Đinh dynasty generals
Vietnamese murder victims